Claudia Fontaine (26 August 1960 – 13 March 2018) was a backing vocalist from Peckham, London.

Career
During the 1980s, Fontaine and fellow backing vocalist Caron Wheeler (and later, third member Naomi Thompson) were known as Afrodiziak. She made an appearance in the video "Back to Life (However Do You Want Me)" with Soul II Soul. 

She joined a number of lovers rock trios, including Mellow Rose, One Love, and True Harmony, then emerged as a soloist. In 1981, she sang a massive Lover's Rock hit "Natural High".

She also performed with such artists as The Jam, Paul Weller, Elvis Costello and The Attractions, Marilyn, Madness, Neneh Cherry, The Specials, Heaven 17, Hothouse Flowers and Howard Jones. Fontaine sang background vocals on the hit single "Free Nelson Mandela" by The Special AKA. Fontaine was the lead vocalist on The Beatmasters' hit single of 1989 "Warm Love", which is included on their debut album Anywayawanna.

She also sang lead vocals on the song "Deeper into Harmony" on The Beatmasters' album of 1992 Life & Soul. She performed backing vocals on Pink Floyd's The Division Bell Tour and the subsequent DVD and CD Pulse. She also toured with Robbie Williams, and performed backing vocals on the album Sing When You're Winning. She sang backing vocals for Joe Cocker at his 2002 London concert with special guest guitarist Brian May.

Death
Claudia Fontaine died on 13 March 2018, aged 57.

Filmography
Pulse (1994)
Showgirls (1995)
Peacetour - Eurythmics (2000)
David Gilmour in Concert (2002)
Alfie (2004)

Discography
"Beat Surrender" (single) – The Jam (1982)
Punch the Clock – Elvis Costello & the Attractions (1983)
Battle Hymns For Children Singing – Haysi Fantayzee (1983)
In the Studio – The Specials (1984)
How Men Are – Heaven 17 (1984)
Dream into Action – Howard Jones (1985)
Despite Straight Lines – Marilyn (1985)
People – Hothouse Flowers (1988)
"Warm Love" (single) – Beatmasters (1989)
Bonafide – Maxi Priest (1990)
Love: And a Million Other Things – Claudia Brücken (1991)
Mothers Heaven – Texas (1991)
Schubert Dip – EMF (1991)
Play – Squeeze (1991)
Flowered Up – Weekender (1992)
"Deeper into Harmony" – Beatmasters (1992)
"Can't Do Both" – Tim Finn (1993)
Funky Little Demons – The Wolfgang Press (1994)
Pulse – Pink Floyd (1995)
Frestonia – Aztec Camera (1995)
Across from Midnight – Joe Cocker (1997)
ReBoot – Sam Brown (2000)
Jealous God – Nathan Larson (2001)
Studio 150  - Paul Weller (2004)

References

External links

1960 births
2018 deaths
20th-century Black British women singers
People from Bethnal Green
English session musicians
Afrodiziak members